Furioso is the second studio album by the heavy metal band Pavor. It was released in 2003 on Imperator Music.

Track listing
All music by Pavor.  All lyrics as noted.
 Inflictor Of Grimness - 9:31 (Armin Rave)
 Perplexer: Perdition Projectile - 5:52 (Rainer Landfermann)
 Wroth Volcanic Vent - 5:32 (Landfermann)
 Furioso - 6:22 (Landfermann)
 A Schizoid Uglifier - 6:16 (Landermann)
 Crucified Hopes - 7:04 (Rave)
 Inconsistent ClayBlood Totemist - 8:31 (Landfermann)
 Dilettante's Dilemma - 2:48 (Landfermann)

Personnel
Claudius Schwartz: Vocals
Armin Rave: Guitars
Rainer Landfermann: Bass
Michael Pelkowsky: Drums, percussion

Production
Produced, recorded, mixed and mastered by Armin Rave and Rainer Landfermann

References

2003 albums
Pavor albums